Cheonjusan (천주산 / 天柱山) is a mountain of Gyeongsangbuk-do, eastern South Korea. It has an elevation of 824 metres.

See also
List of mountains of Korea

References

Mungyeong
Mountains of North Gyeongsang Province
Mountains of South Korea